Tritoxa cuneata is a species of picture-winged fly in the genus Tritoxa of the family Ulidiidae.

Distribution
Canada, United States.

References

Ulidiidae
Diptera of North America
Taxa named by Hermann Loew
Insects described in 1873